The Boston mayoral election of 1955 occurred on Tuesday, November 8, 1955, between Mayor John B. Hynes and State Senator John E. Powers. Hynes was elected to his third term.

The nonpartisan municipal preliminary election was held on September 27, 1955.

Candidates
John B. Hynes, Mayor of Boston, Massachusetts since 1950, Acting Mayor in 1947.
John E. Powers, member of the Massachusetts Senate since 1940.

Candidates eliminated in preliminary
James Michael Curley, Mayor of Boston from 1914 to 1918, 1922 to 1926, 1930 to 1934, 1946 to 1950. Member of the United States House of Representatives from 1913 to 1914 and from 1943 to 1947. Governor of Massachusetts from 1935 to 1937. Member of the Massachusetts House of Representatives from 1902–1903.
Chester A. Dolan, Jr., Clerk of the Massachusetts Supreme Judicial Court. President of the Massachusetts Senate in 1949.

Results

See also
List of mayors of Boston, Massachusetts

References

Boston mayoral
Boston
Mayoral elections in Boston
Non-partisan elections
1950s in Boston